Kermia crassula is a species of sea snail, a marine gastropod mollusk in the family Raphitomidae.

Description
The length of the shell varies between 2.4 mm and 3.1 mm.

Distribution
This marine species occurs off Easter Island.

References

External links
 Rehder H. A. (1980). The marine mollusks of Easter Island (Isla de Pascua) and Sala y Gómez. Smithsonian Contributions to Zoology. 289: 1-167, 15 figs, 14 pls
 

crassula
Gastropods described in 1980